Events from the year 1476 in France

Incumbents
 Monarch – Louis XI

Events
 2 March – Charles the Bold suffers a defeat at the hands of Swiss forces at the Battle of Grandson
 22 June – Charles is defeated a second time at the Battle of Morat
 8 September – The future Louis XII marries his cousin Joan of France

Births
 11 September – Louise of Savoy, regent of France (died 1531)

References

1470s in France